Dinah Jane Milika Ilaisaane Hansen (born June 22, 1997) is an American singer and a member of girl group Fifth Harmony. In October 2017, she featured in RedOne's single "Boom Boom" with Daddy Yankee and French Montana. After the group's hiatus announcement in 2018, Jane signed as a solo artist with L.A. Reid's HitCo Entertainment. Her first single outside of Fifth Harmony, "Bottled Up" featuring Ty Dolla Sign and Marc E. Bassy was released in September 2018. She followed it with the release of her extended play Dinah Jane 1 (2019).

Early life 
Dinah Jane grew up in Santa Ana, California, and is the daughter of Gordon Hansen and Milika Amasio. The eldest of 8 children, she grew up with over 24 family members in her home. Jane is Tongan and has Danish, Samoan, and Fijian descent. She is a member of the Church of Jesus Christ of Latter-day Saints.

Raised in a musical family, Jane was introduced to music at the age of 4. She performed in public for the first time at age seven singing the national anthem, and sang at local events in Orange County. In 2011, she recorded her first song "Dancing Like a White Girl".  She graduated from Orange County School of the Arts in 2015.

Career

2012–2018: The X Factor and Fifth Harmony 

Jane auditioned for The X Factor in 2012 singing "If I Were a Boy" by Beyoncé. For her bootcamp solo performance she sang "Hero" by Mariah Carey and is the only member from Fifth Harmony to have it aired. She sang against Diamond White for her bootcamp round singing "Stronger (What Doesn't Kill You)" during which she forgot some of the lyrics. She was eliminated during the bootcamp round of competition, but was brought back along with Ally Brooke, Normani, Lauren Jauregui, and Camila Cabello to form the girl group now known as Fifth Harmony. The group made it all the way to the finals and landed in third place.

Fifth Harmony's debut song was "Miss Moving On". They released their debut EP, Better Together in 2013, their first album Reflection in January 2015, and their second album 7/27 in May 2016. Their first two albums generated the singles "Worth It" and "Work from Home", respectively, which reached the top 10 in several international charts. The group also contributed music to the soundtrack of the animated film Hotel Transylvania 2 with their song "I'm in Love with a Monster". They released their third self-titled third studio album, and first as a four-member group on August 25, 2017, following Cabello's departure. On March 19, 2018, the group announced an indefinite hiatus to focus on solo projects.

2015–present: Solo work and Dinah Jane 1 

In 2015, Jane auditioned to play the role of the main character in the then-upcoming animated film Moana; however, the role eventually went to Auliʻi Cravalho. Fuse's website included Jane on an article of the faces of future Asian and Pacific history, naming the most promising entertainers of the region in 2017. She was featured in RedOne's song "Boom Boom" along with Daddy Yankee and French Montana. The single was released in October 2017. The following month, Jane sang the Tongan national anthem "Ko e fasi ʻo e tuʻi ʻo e ʻOtu Tonga" at the 2017 Rugby League World Cup semi-final game. Jane released a Christmas medley with singer Leona Lewis in December 2017.

In August 2018, it was announced that Jane had signed a solo record deal with Hitco Entertainment, founded by L.A. Reid and Charles Goldstuck. She released her debut solo single "Bottled Up" featuring Ty Dolla Sign and Marc E. Bassy, along with its lyric video, on September 21, 2018. She released the song's music video and performed the single on The Tonight Show Starring Jimmy Fallon in October 2018. Jane performed two new songs "Retrograde" and "I Don't Mind" at the Jingle Bash on December 3, 2018. On March 26, 2019, Jane released the music video to her then-unreleased song "Retrograde".

On March 28, 2019, Jane announced the release of her debut solo EP, Dinah Jane 1, for April 19, 2019. She released the song "Heard It All Before", followed by its music video, as the EP's lead single on April 19. In May, Jane officially released "Retrograde" for digital download and streaming, followed by  "SZNS" featuring A Boogie wit da Hoodie in July. In January 2020, she announced a solo tour following her first few headline shows during 2019. Titled the Dinah Jane World Tour, it would begin in April 2020 in Arizona and travel to other US locations before performing in selected cities in Europe. Indonesia singer Angez Mo was to be her opening act. Coinciding with her tour announcement, Jane announced a new single to be released on February 14, 2020, titled "Missed a Spot". However, the single was pushed back, with Jane releasing two promotional singles titled "Lottery" and "1501" weeks later instead. "Missed a Spot" was released on April 2, 2020, with an animated visualizer released on YouTube the following day. The tour was postponed due to the COVID-19 pandemic.

Influences
Jane has described her music as "urban R&B ... meets '90s to 2000s". Her musical influences are Christina Aguilera, Patti LaBelle, Beyoncé, Leona Lewis, Mariah Carey and Etta James.

Discography

Extended plays

Singles

Promotional singles

Filmography

Awards and nominations

References

External links 
 

1997 births
21st-century American singers
21st-century American women singers
American child singers
American women pop singers
American people of Danish descent
American people of Fijian descent
American people of Samoan descent
American people of Tongan descent
Fifth Harmony members
Latter Day Saints from California
Living people
People from Santa Ana, California
Singers from California
The X Factor (American TV series) contestants
People from Tongatapu